The Parnall Prawn was an experimental flying boat built in the United Kingdom in 1930. Its single engine was fitted on a tilting mounting in the nose, so that the propeller could be kept clear of the water on takeoff and landing. Only one was built and it is not known whether it was ever flown.

Design and development
The Prawn was a small single-engined flying boat built by Parnall as a one-off to an Air Ministry contract.  Single-engined flying boats are common, but the very unusual feature of the Prawn was that its engine was in the nose.  There are obvious aerodynamic efficiencies, chiefly low drag, in putting the engine of a propeller driven landplane or floatplane in its nose, but flying boats sit low on the water and propeller clearance is a problem even when the aircraft is stationary.  Once moving, spray also becomes a problem.  The Prawn was built to see if these issues could be overcome.  It combined two approaches, using a small propeller hinging the engine mounting  so that the propeller could be raised above the prow when the aircraft was on the water.

Apart from its engine installation, the Prawn was a conventional small flying boat, using a good deal of stainless steel in its construction.  It had a fabric covered parasol wing with a straight leading edge but pronounced outboard taper on the trailing edge.  The lift struts, a pair on each side, sloped up to the wing from low on the hull.  The wing was supported over the fuselage with steel inverted V cabane struts.  There was a generous cut-out in the trailing edge centre section to improve the view from the single open cockpit. Outboard, there were broad chord ailerons and below the wings a pair of stabilising floats mounted on N type struts and braced inboard by another parallel pair.

The Prawn had a single step all-metal hull with conventional empennage.  The fin had a rounded leading edge and was quite tall, carrying an unbalanced rudder.  The tailplane was squarer and mounted just above the top of the fuselage, struts braced to the fuselage below and wire braced to the fin above.  The aircraft was powered with a 65 hp (48 kW) water-cooled Ricardo-Burt engine, driving a four-bladed propeller with a diameter of only about 4 ft 6 in (1.35 m).   Fuel was gravity-fed from a prominent tank on top of the wing centre section.  The inline engine was contained in a slender, slightly pointed cowling of its own, and hinged at the rear.  A bulky, largely rectangular radiator sat on top of the engine cowling, rather spoiling the otherwise neatly streamlined installation that resulted when the engine was in its in-flight position.  At take-off, it could be raised through as much as 22° to clear the water.

Very little is known about the career of the Prawn.  It left Parnall's works at Yate in 1930 and went to the Marine Aircraft Experimental Establishment at Felixstowe bearing RAF serial S1576 for trials and then for experimental purposes, but for how long and with what success seems not to be known. Even its dimensions are not precisely recorded.

Specifications

Bibliography

Citations

Cited sources

1930s British experimental aircraft
Prawn
Single-engined tractor aircraft
Parasol-wing aircraft